Wu Yu Lin is a Taiwanese snooker player.

Career
He represented Chinese Taipei when competing at snooker tournament at the 2009 World Games in Kaohsiung. Lin caused a massive upset as he beat the highest-ranked participating player, Ricky Walden, in the first round. He lost in the second round to Mohammed Shehab.

References

Living people
Taiwanese snooker players
Year of birth missing (living people)
Competitors at the 2009 World Games